Centre for Studies in Social Sciences, Calcutta (CSSSC) is a social science and humanities research and teaching institute in Kolkata, West Bengal, India.

History
Established in 1973 jointly by the Indian Council of Social Science Research and Government of West Bengal, the Centre is one of the top social sciences think tanks of India. The centre was founded by Professor S. Nurul Hasan, when he was the education minister of India. Professor Barun De was appointed as its first director.

Academics

Centre
The centre specializes in post-colonial, subaltern studies and cultural studies research.

Museum
The museum, called Jadunath Sarkar Resource Centre and Museum, houses an extensive collection of vernacular medium primary and secondary literature.

Administration
The Centre is administered by a chairman, director and registrar.

Location
Initially located in Jadunath Bhavan, the former residence of Sir Jadunath Sarkar at 10, Jadunath Sarkar Road (earlier Lake Terrace), Calcutta, the research centre is now located in a new building in Patuli, Calcutta. The resource centre and museum continue to remain in the historian's former residence.

Notable faculty (past and present)
Amiya Bagchi
Partha Chatterjee
Dipesh Chakrabarty
Barun De
Amitav Ghosh
Ramchandra Guha
Sugata Marjit
Gyanendra Pandey
Surajit Chandra Sinha
Tapati Guha-Thakurta

References

External links
 Official website

1973 establishments in West Bengal
Educational institutions established in 1973
Government agencies of India
Ministry of Education (India)
Research and development organizations
Research institutes in India
Research institutes in Kolkata
Research institutes in West Bengal
Social sciences organizations
Think tanks based in India